Avot is a commune in the Côte-d'Or department in the Bourgogne-Franche-Comté region of eastern France.

Geography
Avot is located some 40 km north by north-west of Dijon and 17 km west by north-west of Selongey. Access to the commune is by road D19 from Salives in the west which passes through the centre of the commune and the village before continuing east to join the D959 north of Marey-sur-Tille. The D19K goes north from the village to join the D112C east of Fraignot-et-Vesvrotte. Most of the commune is heavily forested with some small areas of farmland.

The Tille river flows through the heart of the commune from west to east then continues southwards to join the Saône near Les Maillys. The Creuse flows from the north of the commune and joins the Tille at the village.

Neighbouring communes and villages

Heraldry

Administration

List of Successive Mayors

Demography
In 2017 the commune had 187 inhabitants.

Avot Picture Gallery

See also
Communes of the Côte-d'Or department

References

External links

Avot on the old IGN website 
Avot on Géoportail, National Geographic Institute (IGN) website 
Avot on the 1750 Cassini Map

Communes of Côte-d'Or